Fidel Negrete Gamboa (March 23, 1932 – November 17, 2016) was a long-distance runner from Mexico, whose biggest achievement during his career was winning the gold medal in the men's marathon at the 1963 Pan American Games. He represented his nation in the same event at the 1964 Summer Olympics in Tokyo, Japan, where he finished 21st in 2:26:07.

Negrete died on November 17, 2016 following a heart attack. He was 84.

References

External links
 ARRS
 

1932 births
2016 deaths
Mexican male long-distance runners
Athletes (track and field) at the 1963 Pan American Games
Athletes (track and field) at the 1964 Summer Olympics
Olympic athletes of Mexico
Place of birth missing
Pan American Games gold medalists for Mexico
Pan American Games medalists in athletics (track and field)
Central American and Caribbean Games silver medalists for Mexico
Competitors at the 1962 Central American and Caribbean Games
Central American and Caribbean Games medalists in athletics
Medalists at the 1963 Pan American Games
20th-century Mexican people